Capital Area Rural Transportation System or CARTS is a public transportation system serving Bastrop, Blanco, Burnet, Caldwell, Fayette, and Lee counties in Texas, as well as rural areas of Hays, Travis, and Williamson. As of 2008, it serves a total of 169 communities.

References

External links
 Official site

San Marcos, Texas
Transportation in Bastrop County, Texas
Transportation in Blanco County, Texas
Transportation in Burnet County, Texas
Transportation in Caldwell County, Texas
Transportation in Fayette County, Texas
Transportation in Lee County, Texas
Transportation in Hays County, Texas
Transportation in Travis County, Texas
Transportation in Williamson County, Texas